Alloprevotella is a genus of bacteria from the family of Prevotellaceae.

References

Bacteria genera
Taxa described in 2013